Jim Dingley (born 24 March 1942) is a researcher and promoter of Belarusian culture in the UK as well as a translator of Belarusian literature.

Early life 
Dingley was born in Leeds on 24 March 1942. After studies of Russian and other Slavonic languages at the University of Cambridge, he became a lecturer at the University of Reading and then the University of London.

Researcher and promoter of Belarusian culture 
Dingley became involved with Belarusian studies in 1965, after meeting Fr Alexander Nadson. He gave regular lectures at the Anglo-Belarusian Society and contributed a number of articles to The Journal of Belarusian Studies.

He chaired the Anglo-Belarusian Society for several decades and was one of the original trustees of the Francis Skaryna Belarusian Library, serving in that capacity for nearly 40 years.

Translator of Belarusian literature 
Dingley translated into English a number of Belarusian works, including:

 “This Country Called Belarus” (“Краінa Беларусь”) by Uładzimir Arłou;
 “Down Among the Fishes” (“Рыбін горад”) by Natalka Babina;
 "Alindarka's Children: Things Will Be Bad" (“Дзеці Аліндаркі”) by Alhierd Baharevich.

In an interview in 2020, he mentioned that “the difficulties arise when there are specifically Belarusian aspects of the text that may need to be explained to Anglophone readers”.

Awards 

In January 2023, Dingley received a PEN Translates award for his translation of Zekameron by Maxim Znak

References 

1942 births
Living people
Belarusian literature
Slavists
Belarus–United Kingdom relations